Martinton Township is one of twenty-six townships in Iroquois County, Illinois, USA.  As of the 2010 census, its population was 943 and it contained 460 housing units.  Buchanan Township formed from a portion of Papineau Township, then known as Wygant Township, in September 1857; its name was changed to Martinton Township on an unknown date.

Geography

Cities, towns, villages
 Martinton

Extinct towns
 Freedville at

Cemeteries
The township contains these four cemeteries: Greentown, Mount Olivet, Old Burg and Teege.

Major highways
  U.S. Route 52
  Illinois Route 1

Demographics

School districts
 Donovan Community Unit School District 3
 Iroquois County Community Unit School District 9

Political districts
 Illinois' 15th congressional district
 State House District 79
 State Senate District 40

References
 
 United States Census Bureau 2007 TIGER/Line Shapefiles
 United States National Atlas

External links
 City-Data.com
 Illinois State Archives

Townships in Iroquois County, Illinois
1857 establishments in Illinois
Populated places established in 1857
Townships in Illinois